The list of ship decommissionings in 2001 includes a chronological list of all ships decommissioned in 2001.


See also 

2001
 Ship decommissionings
Ship